Tunku Puan Besar Hajah Kurshiah binti Almarhum Tunku Besar Burhanuddin (Jawi: تونكو ڤوان بسر قرشية بنت المرحوم تونكو بسر برهان الدين; 16 May 1911 – 2 February 1999) was the Tunku Ampuan Besar or Queen of Negeri Sembilan. She also served as the first Raja Permaisuri Agong of Malaya between 1957 and 1960.

Tunku Kurshiah's sister, Tunku Durah married her stepson Tuanku Munawir Ibni Al-Marhum Tuanku Abdul Rahman and succeeded her as Tunku Ampuan Besar in 1940.

Early life
Born on 16 May 1911 in Seri Menanti, Negeri Sembilan, she was the eldest daughter of Tunku Besar Burhanuddin ibni Almarhum Tuanku Antah (sometime Regent of Negeri Sembilan). She received her early education at the Seri Menanti Malay School. She also attended private English classes.

Becoming Queen

Tuanku Kurshiah married Tuanku Abdul Rahman ibni Almarhum Tuanku Muhammad, the ruler of Negeri Sembilan as his third wife on 21 May 1929. They were blessed with two daughters; Tuanku Bahiyah, who became Sultanah of Kedah and Tunku Shahariah, who became the wife of Tunku Abdul Rahman, the Tunku Bendahara of Johor.

Upon her husband's accession to the throne of Negeri Sembilan in 1933, Tunku Kurshiah was proclaimed Tunku Ampuan Besar or Queen Consort of Negeri Sembilan.

In 1957, her husband was elected as the first Yang di-Pertuan Agong of independent Malaya (later Malaysia) and she became the first Raja Permaisuri Agong or Queen.

Tuanku Abdul Rahman died in April 1960 and Tunku Kurshiah was given the title of Tunku Puan Besar of Negeri Sembilan.

Social contributions

In 1954, Tuanku Kurshiah was appointed as the President of the Negeri Sembilan Girl Guides. She was also the patron of the Women’s Institute of Negeri Sembilan.

In May 1961, she established the Muslim Women Welfare Council and to date she is the Founder President.

On 27 October 1974, she was awarded the Tun Fatimah Gold Medal by the National Council of Women’s Organisations for her contribution in elevating the standard of women and children through welfare and education.

Death
Tunku Kurshiah died in her sleep at 4:50 pm due to old age and from an illness in Kuala Lumpur on 2 February 1999 and her remains were buried at the Seri Menanti Royal Mausoleum in Seri Menanti.

Family of Queens
Tunku Kurshiah due to her royal lineage has links to many former queens of Negeri Sembilan but also has links with many of the royal families of the other states. Her daughter Tuanku Bahiyah became Sultanah of Kedah and later the fifth Raja Permaisuri Agong. Both her younger sisters succeeded her as Tunku Ampuan Besar, first by Tunku Ampuan Durah who was married to her eldest stepson Tuanku Munawir and second by her youngest sister Tuanku Najihah, who married her youngest stepson Tuanku Jaafar ibni Almarhum Tuanku Abdul Rahman. Tuanku Najihah also followed in Tunku Kurshiah's footsteps and served as the 10th Raja Permaisuri Agong.

Awards and recognitions

Honours
 :
  Grand Commander of the Order of the Defender of the Realm (SMN) - Tun (1958)
  Recipient of the Order of the Crown of the Realm (DMN) (1980)
 :
  Member of the Royal Family Order of Kedah (DK) (29 February 1964)
 :
  Member of the Royal Family Order of Negeri Sembilan (D.K.N.S.)

Places named after her
Several places were named after her, including: 

 Jalan Tunku Kurshiah in Seremban, Negeri Sembilan
 Taman Tunku Kurshiah (residential area in Seremban)
 Tunku Kurshiah College (renamed from Maktab Perempuan Melayu)
 SK Tunku Kurshiah, primary school in Kuala Pilah, Negeri Sembilan
 SMK Tunku Kurshiah, secondary school in Kuala Pilah, Negeri Sembilan
 The University of Malaya also renamed its Third Residential College to Tunku Kurshiah Residential College.

See also 
Yang di-Pertuan Agong
Raja Permaisuri Agong

References

Malaysian royal consorts
Negeri Sembilan royal consorts
1911 births
1999 deaths
Royal House of Negeri Sembilan
Malaysian Muslims
Malaysian people of Minangkabau descent
Grand Commanders of the Order of the Defender of the Realm
20th-century Malaysian politicians
Malaysian queens consort
Recipients of the Order of the Crown of the Realm